Surin Klomjai (born 24 February 1951) is a Thai sports shooter. He competed in two events at the 1996 Summer Olympics.

References

1951 births
Living people
Surin Klomjai
Surin Klomjai
Shooters at the 1996 Summer Olympics
Place of birth missing (living people)
Surin Klomjai
Asian Games medalists in shooting
Shooters at the 1994 Asian Games
Shooters at the 1998 Asian Games
Medalists at the 1994 Asian Games
Surin Klomjai